Colias phicomone, the mountain clouded yellow, is a butterfly in the family Pieridae. It is found in the Cantabrian Mountains, the Pyrenees, the Carpathian Mountains and the Alps. It flies at altitudes of 900 to 2800 meters. 

The wingspan is 40–50 mm. The butterfly flies from June to August depending on the location.

The larvae feed on Fabaceae species.

Subspecies
Colias phicomone phicomone (Alps, northern Carpathians, northern Italy)
Colias phicomone juliana Hospital, 1948 (Cantabria)
Colias phicomone oberthueri Verity, [1909] (Pyrenees)
Colias phicomone phila Fruhstorfer, 1903 (Kashmir)

External links
 Butterflies of Europa

phicomone
Near threatened animals
Butterflies of Europe
Butterflies described in 1780